The 2018 St. Petersburg Ladies' Trophy was a professional tennis tournament played on indoor hard courts. It was the 9th edition of the tournament and third time as a WTA Premier tournament. It was part of the 2018 WTA Tour and was held between 29 January and 4 February 2018.

Point distribution

Prize money

1Qualifiers prize money is also the Round of 32 prize money.
*per team

Singles main draw entrants

Seeds

1 Rankings as of January 15, 2018.

Other entrants
The following players received wildcards into the singles main draw:
  Petra Kvitová
  Anastasia Potapova
  Elena Vesnina
  Vera Zvonareva

The following players received entry from the qualifying draw:
  Viktória Kužmová 
  Tereza Martincová 
  Elena Rybakina 
  Roberta Vinci

The following player received entry as a lucky loser:
  Andrea Petkovic

Withdrawals 
Before the tournament
 Simona Halep → replaced by  Andrea Petkovic
 Ana Konjuh → replaced by  Tatjana Maria
 Elise Mertens → replaced by  Donna Vekić
 Anastasija Sevastova → replaced by  Kateřina Siniaková
 Barbora Strýcová → replaced by  Maria Sakkari
 Carla Suárez Navarro → replaced by  Mona Barthel

Retirements 
 Kiki Bertens

Doubles main draw entrants

Seeds

1 Rankings as of January 15, 2018.

Other entrants 
The following pair received a wildcard into the doubles main draw:
  Valeriya Pogrebnyak /  Elena Rybakina

Champions

Singles

  Petra Kvitová def.  Kristina Mladenovic, 6–1, 6–2

Doubles

  Timea Bacsinszky /  Vera Zvonareva def.  Alla Kudryavtseva /  Katarina Srebotnik, 2–6, 6–1, [10–3]

References

External links
 Official website

St. Petersburg Ladies' Trophy
St. Petersburg Ladies Trophy
2018 in Russian women's sport
St. Petersburg
St. Petersburg
2018 in Russian tennis